Sven Ragnar Thunman (20 April 1920 – 8 July 2004) was a Swedish ice hockey defenseman. Between 1946 and 1957 he capped 114 times with the Swedish national team and scored 14 goals. During that time he won a gold, a silver and a bronze medal at the 1952 Winter Olympics, finishing fourth in 1948.

Thunman won three Swedish titles with Södertälje, in 1944, 1953 and 1956. After retiring from competitions he first worked as a coach with Väsby IK in 1959–64. He then became an ice hockey and football referee in the 1960s and 1970s, and was a korpfotball referee until his death in 2004.

References 

1920 births
2004 deaths
Ice hockey players at the 1952 Winter Olympics
Ice hockey players at the 1948 Winter Olympics
Olympic bronze medalists for Sweden
Olympic ice hockey players of Sweden
People from Södertälje
Södertälje SK players
Swedish ice hockey players
Olympic medalists in ice hockey
Medalists at the 1952 Winter Olympics
Sportspeople from Stockholm County